Isaac H. Smith Jr. House is a historic home located at New Bern, Craven County, North Carolina.  It was built between 1923 and 1924, and is a two-story American Craftsman style frame dwelling with a brick basement and small attic story.  It was the home of Isaac H. Smith Jr. (1899-1953), one of New Bern's most financially successful African-American businessmen.

It was listed on the National Register of Historic Places in 2002.

References

African-American history of North Carolina
Houses on the National Register of Historic Places in North Carolina
Houses completed in 1924
Houses in New Bern, North Carolina
National Register of Historic Places in Craven County, North Carolina
1924 establishments in North Carolina